Guru Teg Bahadur Hospital (or GTBH or GTB Hospital) is a large hospital situated at Dilshad Garden, Shahdara, Delhi, India, and is affiliated to and acts as the teaching hospital of University College of Medical Sciences, University of Delhi.

GTBH was established in 1979 (fully functional in 1987) with a 350-bed capacity which has been expanded to 1700-beds. It is the first Delhi Government tertiary care hospital in the Trans-Yamuna area, catering to the East Delhi population as well as people from adjacent states.

Location
The Guru Teg Bahadur Hospital is located in Dilshad Garden, Shahdara, East Delhi.

History
The hospital was established in 1987 with 350 beds, as an associated teaching hospital attached to the University College of Medical Sciences, University of Delhi. In 2006 it was recorded to have near 1,000 beds. Later figures report a capacity of 1,700 beds.

UCMS was founded in 1971, due to the efforts of the Health Minister of New Delhi. It was proposed by the  minister to provide medical education to every student who attained the eligibility criteria and wished to become a doctor. The criteria being stringent (minimum 60% aggregate), but it still caused a 100 or so students to be left out, even with the presence of two Medical Colleges in Delhi – MAMC and LHMC. That year classes began in the makeshift Department of Chemistry, Delhi University, North Campus. This was to become the UCMS of tomorrow. It then started having its clinical postings (practicals) at Meerut Medical College. Shortly, it was shifted to Safdarjung Hospital in South Delhi.
 
In 1986, it shifted to its present location at Dilshad Garden and was associated with  Guru Teg Bahadur Hospital, a 1000 bedded institution, as its teaching hospital.

Thus GTBH actually became functional in 1986 though construction was over in 1979 and some departments began functioning before 1987.

Facilities

 Anti Retroviral Treatment (ART)for HIV & AIDS treatment 
 Out Patient Clinics 
 Inpatient care (admissions)
 Emergency services
 Critical care
 Suraksha Clinic
 Specialist care
 Laboratory services
 Imaging services
 Medico legal aid
 Nodal Center under National Programs
 Teaching facilities
 Examination services

Outpatient clinics

Outpatient clinics are held in the Outpatient Department. There are 3 floors (ground, 1st and 2nd floors). Each floor has approximately 100 rooms.

References

Hospital buildings completed in 1979
Teaching hospitals in India
Organizations established in 1979
Hospitals in Delhi
1979 establishments in Delhi
20th-century architecture in India